The Autovía A-3 (also called Autovía del Este) is a Spanish autovía which starts in Madrid and ends in Valencia. It is the shortest of the six radial autovías stemming from Madrid, at 355 km (220.5 miles), and the entirety of the route forms the entirety of the European route E901, a B class road in the International E-road network.

Sections

Major cities crossed

Madrid
Arganda del Rey
Tarancón
Honrubia
Motilla del Palancar
Minglanilla
Utiel
Requena
Buñol
Cheste
Valencia

Route

 
 / : Madrid – Atalaya del Cañavate – Valencia

External links 
 UN Economic Commission for Europe: Overall Map of E-road Network (2007)
 Autovía A-3 in Google Maps
 International E-road network

A-3
A-3
A-3
A-3
International E-road network
Roads in Spain